De Férias com o Ex Brasil (English: Vacation with the Ex), known as  Ex on the Beach Brasil in Latin America and Portugal, is a Brazilian reality television series based on the British television series Ex on the Beach. The series premiered on Thursday, October 13, 2016 at 10:00 p.m. on MTV.

It features ten single men and women enjoying a summer holiday in paradise whilst looking for love. However, they were joined by their exes to shake things up. Each ex was there either for painful revenge or to rekindle their love. The show is narrated by Allan Arnold.

Season overview

Cast

Other appearances
In addition to appearing on De Férias com o Ex, some of the cast members went on to compete in other reality TV shows.

  A Fazenda (The Farm)

Ilha Record (Record Island)

Power Couple

 The Challenge

References

External links
Official website

2016 Brazilian television series debuts
Brazilian reality television series
Television shows filmed in Bahia
Television shows filmed in Rio Grande do Norte
Television shows filmed in São Paulo (state)
MTV original programming
Ex on the Beach
Gay-related television shows
Bisexuality-related television series